George Green (born September 15, 1927) is a former NASCAR Grand National Series driver.  He finished 55th at both the 1959 Daytona 500 and the 1960 Daytona 500, with him exiting the 1960 race with a gas tank explosion.  He also finished 16th in the 1962 NASCAR Grand National Series standings, racing 46 of 53 total races.

Green was also a sergeant in the U.S. Army.

References

External links

1927 births
American racing drivers
NASCAR drivers
Living people